Paul Dittrich (11 November 1868, Vienna, Austro-Hungarian Empire – 30 December 1939, Salzburg, Nazi Germany) was an Austrian photographer who established himself in Ottoman Egypt in 1894. He succeeded Ignaz Heyman at Heyman's studio in Cairo. Dittrich was one of the photographers to the Court of Egypt. 

American journalist Amédée Baillot de Guerville refers to him in his book New Egypt (1905) by stating:"To those in Cairo I can thoroughly recommend either M. Lekégian or M. Dittrich, photographer to the Court. The latter has a wonderful collection of portraits, admirably done, of all the more important persons. His rooms are a real museum of all the celebrities, masculine and feminine, whom Cairo has known in the last five-and-twenty years."

Gallery

References

Further reading 

 
 Jacobson, Ken (2007). Odalisques & Arabesques: Orientalist Photography 1839-1925. London: Quaritch. ISBN 9780955085253, OCLC 883254420.
 Perez, Nissan N. (1988) Focus East: Early Photography in the Near East 1839-1885. New York: Harry N. Abrams, Inc.

External links 

1868 births
1939 deaths
Expatriate photographers in Egypt
Austrian expatriates in Egypt
Austrian photographers
Portrait photographers